Artur Ruslanovich Tlisov (born 10 June 1982) is a Russian former football player. He made his debut in the Russian Premier League in 2001 for FC Chernomorets Novorossiysk.

Career statistics

Honours
 Russian Premier League champion: 2003.

External links
 
  Profile on the FC Kuban Krasnodar site

1982 births
Living people
People from Cherkessk
Russian footballers
Russia under-21 international footballers
Association football midfielders
FC Chernomorets Novorossiysk players
PFC CSKA Moscow players
FC Kuban Krasnodar players
Russian Premier League players
Sportspeople from Karachay-Cherkessia